1969 Coppa delle Alpi shows the results of the 1969 tournament that was held in Switzerland in the preseason 1969/70. The Coppa delle Alpi (translated as Cup of the Alps) was a football tournament, first organized by the Italian national league to start the season 1960/61 and then they aided by the Swiss League after 1962. This competition ran from 1960 until 1987.

Most of the games in the 1969 competition were played in Switzerland, three were played in Hof, one in Rüsselsheim. The teams taking part were Lausanne Sports, Zürich, Basel and Biel-Bienne. From Belgium K.S.V. Waregem were qualified and from Italy were Bologna, Hellas Verona, Sampdoria and Napoli. Qualified from Germany were Alemannia Aachen, Eintracht Frankfurt  and Bayern Hof.  Two teams from each country were divided into each of the two groups. Teams did not play compatriots; Waregem did not play Eintracht.

Group A

Matches
Round 1

Round 2

Round 3

Round 4

Table

Group B

Matches
Round 1

Round 2

Round 3

Round 4

Table

Final

Sources and References 
 Cup of the Alps 1968 at RSSSF

Cup of the Alps
Alps